Six Mile Lake Provincial Park is a provincial park located in Ontario, Canada, near Georgian Bay on Six Mile Lake.

Popular features of the park include hiking trails and three beaches. There is an abundance of wildlife, including walking sticks and five-lined skinks.

References

External links

Provincial parks of Ontario
Parks in the District Municipality of Muskoka
Protected areas established in 1958
1958 establishments in Ontario